Sachiwalay Halt railway station is a railway station in Patna district, Bihar. Its code is SCY. It serves Patna city. The station consists of two platforms.

References

External links 

 Official website of the Patna district

Railway stations in Patna
Railway stations in Patna district
Danapur railway division